John Longland  was a 16th century English priest.

Longland was educated at Brasenose College, Oxford. He was Archdeacon of Buckingham from 1559 until his death in 1589.

References

Alumni of Brasenose College, Oxford
Archdeacons of Buckingham
16th-century English Anglican priests
1589 deaths

Year of birth unknown